The 1985 World Badminton Grand Prix was the third edition of the World Badminton Grand Prix finals. It was held in Tokyo, Japan, from December 12 to December 15, 1985.

Results

Third place

Final

References
Smash: World Grand Prix Finals, Tokyo 1985

World Grand Prix
World Grand Prix
World Badminton Grand Prix
World Badminton
Badminton tournaments in Japan